Myendung Singpho (born 23 October 1996) is an Indian cricketer. He made his List A debut for Arunachal Pradesh in the 2018–19 Vijay Hazare Trophy on 19 September 2018. He made his first-class debut for Arunachal Pradesh in the 2018–19 Ranji Trophy on 28 November 2018. He made his Twenty20 debut on 8 November 2019, for Arunachal Pradesh in the 2019–20 Syed Mushtaq Ali Trophy.

References

External links
 

1996 births
Living people
Indian cricketers
Arunachal Pradesh cricketers
Place of birth missing (living people)